Geoffrey Thomas Sandford Baylis (24 November 1913 – 31 December 2003) was a New Zealand botanist and Emeritus Professor specialising in plant pathology and mycorrhiza. He was employed at the University of Otago for 34 years undertaking research into plant and fungal ecology and symbiotic interactions, taxonomy and anatomy. He collected hundreds of plant specimens in the field and founded the Otago Regional Herbarium (OTA). He discovered the sole Pennantia baylisiana living on Three Kings Island in 1945, and was elected as a Fellow of the Royal Society of New Zealand in 1961.

Early life and education 
Baylis was born in Palmerston North to Gerald Baylis, an agricultural scientist, and his wife Daisy (Kathleen Daisy Baylis (nee Aston), sister of New Zealand botanist Bernard Aston). The family moved to Campbells Bay on Auckland's North Shore in 1920, where Geoff and his sister Geraldine attended Takapuna Primary School and were then some of the first students at Campbells Bay School. 

Geoff attended Takapuna Grammar School before enrolling at the University of Auckland (then Auckland University College) in 1931. In 1935, he earned his MSc on the ecology of the mangrove Avicennia resinifera (now Avicennia marina subsp. australasia) with a thesis entitled, "Some observations on Avicennia officinalis Linn in New Zealand". In 1936, a scholarship enabled Baylis to attend London Imperial College where he gained his PhD in 1938 in Plant Pathology. His PhD thesis was entitled, "The influence of certain fungi on the germination of peas; and, A physiological study of the pathogenicity of several species of Sclerotinia".

On returning to New Zealand, Baylis joined the DSIR at Lincoln where he researched diseases of linen flax (Linum usitatissimum). In 1940, he volunteered for the Royal New Zealand Navy. During his World War II service he served on board the HMS Crocus on Atlantic convoy duty.

Professional life 
In 1946, he was appointed Lecturer-in-Charge of Botany at University of Otago, taking over from the Rev. Dr J. E. Holloway. He became first Professor of Botany (1952) and was Head of the Department for 34 years, retiring in 1978. Based on his numerous plant collections, Baylis founded the Otago Regional Herbarium (OTA), which is located at the Botany Department at the University of Otago.

Geoff Baylis' research made several important contributions to our understanding of the role of mycorrhizae, or the symbiotic relationship between plant roots and soil fungi. His pioneering experiments on endomycorrhizae in broadleaf (Griselinia littoralis) showed that seedlings growing in natural soils develop vescicular-arbuscular mycorrhizae by associating with fungi that assist with phosphorus uptake, whereas seedlings that did not develop such mycorrhize stagnated. Other researchers at the University of Otago (including Baylis and his research students) and elsewhere completed similar studies on other plants thereby extending his early results.

Honours and awards 
He was elected a Fellow of the Royal Society of New Zealand in 1961, and attended his last Fellows' AGM on his 90th birthday, as one of the two longest serving living fellows. He served on the Otago Museum Trust Board as the University's Representative. He received the Royal Society's Hutton Medal in 1994; he was a foundation and life-long member and President of the New Zealand Ecological Society; and in 1997 he was elected an Associate of Honour of the Royal Horticultural Institute of New Zealand. He also served for many years on the Catlins Forest Park Advisory Committee. In 1959, Geoff became one of the three founding Governors of the Hellaby Grasslands Trust, a position he maintained for 42 years.

The annual Geoff Baylis Lecture was established by the Botanical Society of Otago in 2002 to honour his contributions to the society and field of botany. Geoff Baylis was the speaker at the inaugural lecture in 2002, and as of 2022 there have been a total of 20 different lectures and speakers in the intervening years.

Eponymy 
The following species of plants and fungi have been named in honour of Geoff Baylis:

 The critically endangered tree, Pennantia baylisiana (W.R.B.Oliv) G.T.S.Baylis, or Three Kings kaikōmako.
 The liverwort Plagiochila baylisii Inoue & R.M.Schust., which was thought to be endemic to Fiordland, South Island, New Zealand but is also known from Tasmania, Australia.
 The critically endangered secotioid fungus Deconica baylisiana (E. Horak) J.A. Cooper (originally described by Egon Horak in 1971 as Nivatogastrium baylisianum E. Horak).

Family and personal life 
In his younger years, Baylis was an avid mountaineer and took part in several climbing trips to the Southern Alps. In 1965 he and his climbing companions had to be rescued by plane after being trapped by bad weather on the Volta Glacier.

Baylis flatted in, and later bought, the historic Dunedin house "Threave" in upper High Street, a Robert Lawson-designed house which he fully restored, as well as extending the building's woodland surrounds. He became a collector of art and antique silverware and porcelain, and was a regular attendee at classical music concerts. He also had an extensive garden which contained both native and exotic species.

Geoff remained unmarried throughout his life, but kept close ties with his sister Genevieve Chamberlain and her family. He moved back to Campbells Bay, next door to the original family home (which he had bought and restored for his nephew Geoffrey Chamberlain). He died there on New Year's Eve, 2003, at the age of 90.

Taxon names authored 
Geoff Balyis named seven species in four different genera of plants.

 Elingamita G.T.S.Baylis
 Elingamita johnsonii G.T.S.Baylis
 Pennantia baylisiana (W.R.B.Oliv) G.T.S.Baylis
 Solanum aviculare var. latifolium G.T.S.Baylis
 Solanum capsiciforme (Domin) G.T.S.Baylis

Selected works

Image Gallery

References 

20th-century New Zealand botanists
Academic staff of the University of Otago
1913 births
2003 deaths
New Zealand Fellows of the Royal Society
New Zealand conservationists
People from Palmerston North